This is a list of diplomatic missions in Georgia. There are currently 38 embassies in Tbilisi. Many other countries have non-resident embassies. Russia closed its embassy right after the beginning of the war in South Ossetia in August 2008 and diplomatic relations between the two countries have ended.

Diplomatic missions in Tbilisi

Embassies

Other missions or delegations 
 (Delegation)
 (Interests Section)
 (Embassy office)
 (Embassy office)

Gallery

Consulate-General in Batumi

Non-resident embassies accredited to Georgia 
Resident in Ankara, Turkey:

Resident in Baku, Azerbaijan:

Resident in Moscow, Russia:

Resident in Kyiv, Ukraine:

Resident in Warsaw, Poland:
 

Resident in Yerevan, Armenia:

Other Resident Locations:

References

External links 
  List of embassies

Georgia
Diplomatic missions